Khelil is a town and commune in Bordj Bou Arréridj Province in Hautes Plaines area, Algeria. According to the 1998 census it has a population of 23,537.

References

Communes of Bordj Bou Arréridj Province